Stephen Platner Tharinger (born 1949) is an American politician of the Democratic Party. He is a member of the Washington House of Representatives, representing the 24th district.

References

Democratic Party members of the Washington House of Representatives
County commissioners in Washington (state)
Living people
21st-century American politicians
1949 births